This is a list of active stock exchanges in Oceania.

Stock Exchanges in Oceania

See also 
 List of stock exchanges

References

Oceania